The American Historical Review is a quarterly academic history journal published by Oxford University Press on behalf of the American Historical Association, for which it is its official publication. It targets readers interested in all periods and facets of history and has often been described as the premier journal of American history in the world. According to Journal Citation Reports, the AHR has the highest impact factor among all history journals at 2.188.

History

Founded in 1895, The American Historical Review was a joint effort between the history departments at Cornell University and at Harvard University, modeled on The English Historical Review and the French Revue historique, "for the promotion of historical studies, the collection and preservation of historical documents and artifacts, and the dissemination of historical research."

The journal is published in March, June, September, and December as a book-like academic publication with research papers and book reviews, among other items (each issue typically runs to about 500 pages). Each year, approximately 25 articles are published in the journal. The acceptance rate for submissions is around 9 percent. The journal also publishes approximately 1,000 book reviews per year.

Editorial board
The editorial offices are located at Indiana University Bloomington, where a small staff produces the publication under the guidance of a 12-member advisory board. From the October 2007 issue until 2011, the journal was published by the University of Chicago Press. As of 2012, the journal has been published by the Oxford University Press.

The editorial board of the AHR is composed of scholars in a number of fields and subfields, including medieval and early modern Europe, western and eastern Europe and Russia, East and South Asia, Latin America, early and modern US, Middle East, and methods and theory.

See also
History journals
American Historical Association

References

External links 
 Some back issues in full text

Further reading

External links 

 

History journals
Publications established in 1895
Oxford University Press academic journals
English-language journals
Indiana University
Academic journals associated with learned and professional societies of the United States
5 times per year journals
American Historical Association